The Sele School is a coeducational secondary school and sixth form with academy status, located in Hertford, Hertfordshire, in the south east of England. The school is situated adjacent to the Sele Farm estate, a major housing area containing a mixture of private and housing association properties. The school serves the Hertford area, with pupils coming from local villages as well as the town.

The Sele School is well known for its inclusive approach and success with students from both ends of the ability spectrum.

The Sele School was the first school in the country to be awarded dual specialist school status in Performing Arts and Sport.

References

External links
Home page

Secondary schools in Hertfordshire
Academies in Hertfordshire